Raimel Antonio Tapia Linarez (born February 4, 1994) is a Dominican professional baseball outfielder in the Boston Red Sox organization. Tapia made his Major League Baseball (MLB) debut in 2016 with the Colorado Rockies and has also played in MLB for the Toronto Blue Jays.

Career

Colorado Rockies
The Colorado Rockies signed Tapia as an international free agent in 2010.  He spent the 2013 season with the Grand Junction Rockies of the Rookie-level Pioneer League, and was named the league's player of the month for July. He had a 29-game hitting streak for Grand Junction. After the season, he was named the Topps Pioneer League Player of the Year for 2013 and was named by Baseball Prospectus as the No. 97 prospect in all of baseball prior to the 2014 season. The Rockies added him to their 40-man roster after the 2015 season.Tapia began the 2016 season with the Hartford Yard Goats of the Class AA Eastern League, and was selected to appear in the 2016 All-Star Futures Game. The Rockies promoted him to the Albuquerque Isotopes of the Class AAA Pacific Coast League in August.

The Rockies promoted Tapia to the major leagues on September 2, 2016.

On July 20, 2018, Tapia hit a two out, two strike, go-ahead pinch hit grand slam in the top of the 7th inning against Arizona Diamondbacks reliever Archie Bradley to give the Rockies an 11–8 lead. It was the first grand slam of Tapia's career and would ultimately prove to be the difference as the Rockies would go on to win the game 11–10.

In 2018, in 25 at bats he hit .200/.259/.480. He had the fastest baserunning sprint speed of all major league designated hitters, at 28.6 feet/second.

Tapia received more playing time in 2020 after Ian Desmond opted out of the season because of the COVID-19 pandemic. In 51 games, Tapia hit .321, drove in 17 runs, and stole eight bases.

In 2021 he batted .273/.327/.372. He had the highest ground ball/fly ball ratio in the major leagues, at 4.10, the highest ground ball percentage, at 67.4%, and the lowest fly ball percentage, at 16.4%.

Toronto Blue Jays
On March 24, 2022, Tapia and Adrian Pinto were traded to the Toronto Blue Jays in exchange for Randal Grichuk.

On July 22, 2022, in the top of the 3rd inning, Tapia hit an inside the park grand slam at Fenway Park against the Boston Red Sox, the second in franchise history. The Blue Jays would go on to win the game 28-5, setting a franchise record for the most runs scored in a single game.

On November 15, 2022, Tapia was designated for assignment. He was non-tendered and became a free agent on November 18.

Boston Red Sox
In January 2023, Tapia signed a minor-league contract with the Boston Red Sox and was named a non-roster invitee to spring training.

Scouting report
Tapia has been noted for altering his batting stance during at-bats. He generally stands at the plate with an upright stance except when there are two strikes against him, at which point he crouches deeply, dropping his eye level approximately five and three quarter inches.

References

External links

1994 births
Living people
Albuquerque Isotopes players
Asheville Tourists players
Colorado Rockies players
Dominican Republic expatriate baseball players in the United States
Dominican Summer League Rockies players
Grand Junction Rockies players
Hartford Yard Goats players
Major League Baseball outfielders
Major League Baseball players from the Dominican Republic
Modesto Nuts players
Sportspeople from San Pedro de Macorís
Salt River Rafters players
Toronto Blue Jays players